Uroš Milovanović (born 18 October 2000) is a Serbian football forward who plays for Spanish club Sporting de Gijón.

References

External links
 
 

2000 births
Living people
Association football midfielders
Serbian footballers
Serbia under-21 international footballers
Serbian First League players
Serbian SuperLiga players
RFK Grafičar Beograd players
FK Radnički Niš players
FK Radnik Surdulica players
Sporting de Gijón players
Footballers from Duisburg
Serbian expatriate footballers
Serbian expatriate sportspeople in Spain
Expatriate footballers in Spain